Georg Graf Henckel von Donnersmarck (August 5, 1902 in Grambschütz – May 2, 1973 in Bonn) was a German politician (Christian Social Union in Bavaria (CSU)). Henckel von Donnersmarck was a member of the German Bundestag from 1953 to 1957 and from 5 September 1959, when he succeeded the late Josef Oesterle, until 1961. 

1902 births
1973 deaths
Members of the Bundestag for Bavaria
Members of the Bundestag 1957–1961
Members of the Bundestag 1953–1957
Members of the Bundestag for the Christian Social Union in Bavaria